William Henry Allen (March 27, 1808 – August 29, 1882) was an American professor and academic administrator. A graduate of Bowdoin College, he served as acting president of Dickinson College from 1847 until 1848, and later was selected as the second president of the Pennsylvania State University, serving from 1864 until 1866. He was elected to the American Philosophical Society in 1858.

References

 William Henry Allen 1864-1866
 Dickinson College: College President Chronology

Dickinson College
1808 births
1882 deaths
Bowdoin College alumni
Presidents of Pennsylvania State University
People from Readfield, Maine
Academics from Maine
Presidents of Dickinson College